Achilidae is a family of planthoppers, sometimes called "achilids" in the order Hemiptera. There are at least 520 described species in Achilidae.

Subfamilies and Genera
Fulgoromorpha Lists on the Web (FLOW) includes 3 subfamilies:

Achilinae

Authority: Stål, 1866 - 2 tribes
Achilini Stål, 1866
Achilina Stål, 1866
 Achilus Kirby, 1819 - type genus
 Flatachilus Fennah, 1950
 Olmiana Guglielmino, Bückle & Emeljanov, 2010
 Ouwea Distant, 1907
Cixidiina Emeljanov, 1992
 †Angustachilus Lefebvre, Bourgoin & Nel, 2007
 Cixidia Fieber, 1866
Elidipterina Fennah, 1950

 Booneta Distant, 1907
 Catonidia Uhler, 1896
 Elidiptera Spinola, 1839
 Faventilla Metcalf, 1948
 Messeis (planthopper) Stål, 1860
 Metaphradmon Fennah, 1950
 Paracatonidia – P. webbeda Long, Yang & Chen, 2015
 Paraphradmon Fennah, 1950
 Parelidiptera Fennah, 1950
 Phradmonicus Emeljanov, 1991
 Prinoessa Fennah, 1950
 Uniptera Ball, 1933

 Achilini incertae sedis

 Anabunda Emeljanov, 2005
 Aneipo Kirkaldy, 1906
 Bunduica (planthopper) Jacobi, 1909
 Dipsiathus Emeljanov, 2005
 Epiona (planthopper) Emeljanov, 2005
 Mabira (planthopper) Fennah, 1950
 Nelidia Stål, 1860
 Parabunda Emeljanov, 2005
 †Paratesum Emeljanov & Shcherbakov, 2009
 †Protomenocria Emeljanov & Shcherbakov, 2009
 †Psycheona Emeljanov & Shcherbakov, 2009
 Rhinochloris Emeljanov, 2005
 †Gedanochila Brysz & Szwedo, 2022
 †Protepiptera Usinger, 1939

Achillini Emeljanov, 1991
 Achilla (planthopper) Haglund, 1899
 †Hooleya (planthopper) Cockerell, 1922
 Maurisca Emeljanov, 2005

Apatesoninae
Authority: Metcalf, 1938 - 4 monotypic tribes
 Apateson Fowler, 1900: Apatesonini Metcalf, 1938
 Ilva (planthopper) Stål, 1866: Ilvini Emeljanov, 1991
 Sevia Stål, 1866: Seviini Emeljanov, 1991
 Tropiphlepsia Muir, 1924: Tropiphlepsiini Emeljanov, 1991

Myconinae

Authority: Fennah, 1950 - 6 tribes
Amphignomini Emeljanov, 1991
 Amphignoma Emeljanov, 1991
Mycarini Emeljanov, 1991
 Acocarinus Emeljanov, 1991
 Emeljanocarinus Bourgoin & Soulier-Perkins, 2006
 Katbergella Fennah, 1950
 Mycarinus Emeljanov, 1991
 Mycarus Emeljanov, 1991
Myconini Fennah, 1950
 Ganachilla – G. zhenyuanensis Wang & Huang, 1989
 Haicixidia – H. jianfengensis Wang, 1989
 Myconellus Fennah, 1950
 Myconus (planthopper) Stål, 1860
 Myrophenges Fennah, 1965
Plectoderini Fennah, 1950.   Selected genera

 Abas (planthopper) Fennah, 1950
 Callichlamys (planthopper) Kirkaldy, 1907
 Cernea (planthopper) Williams, 1977
 Cnidus (planthopper) Stål, 1866
 Cythna (planthopper) Kirkaldy, 1906
 Deferunda Distant, 1912
 Francesca (planthopper) Kirkaldy, 1906
 Gordiacea (planthopper) Metcalf, 1948
 Haitiana Dozier, 1936
 Hamba (planthopper) Distant, 1907
 Kosalya (planthopper) Distant, 1906
 Kurandella Fennah, 1950
 Magadha (planthopper) Distant, 1906
 Mahuna Distant, 1907
 Nyonga (planthopper) Synave, 1959
 Opsiplanon Fennah, 1945
 Plectoderes Spinola, 1839
 Quadrana Caldwell, 1951
 Rhinocolura (planthopper) Fennah, 1950
 Spino (planthopper) Fennah, 1950
 Synecdoche (planthopper) O'Brien, 1971
 Taloka (planthopper) Distant, 1907
 Usana (planthopper) Distant, 1906

Rhotalini Fennah, 1950
 Errada Walker, 1868
 Errotasa Emeljanov, 2005
 Hebrotasa Melichar, 1915
 Rhotala Walker, 1857
 Taractellus Metcalf, 1948
Waghildini† Szwedo, 2006
 Waghilde Szwedo, 2006

incertae sedis
 †Acixiites Hamilton, 1990
 Leptarciella Fennah, 1958
 †Niryasaburnia Szwedo, 2004
 Parasabecoides Synave, 1965
 Peltatavertexalis – P. horizontalis Xu, Long & Chen, 2019
 Ridesa Schumacher, 1915
 Sabecoides Fennah, 1958

To be placed
GBIF also includes the following genera that may have doubtful placement:

 Chiotasa Melichar, 1915
 Cionoderus Uhler, 1895
 Messoides Metcalf, 1930
 Nablusitypus Kaddumi, 2005
 Neomenocria Fennah, 1950
 Okatropis Matsumura, 1910
 Planusfrons Chun Liang Chen, Chung Tu Yang & Wilson, 1989
 Plectoderella Fennah, 1950
 Pyren Fennah, 1950
 Rhotella Metcalf, 1938
 Spendon Jacobi, 1928
 Tabiana Jacobi, 1928
 Tudea Distant, 1907
 Winawa Haupt, 1926

References

Further reading
 List of Achilidae genera

External links

 

 
Auchenorrhyncha families
Fulgoromorpha